Huey Dunbar (born Eustace Dunbar IV; May 15, 1974) is the former singer of Dark Latin Groove. Born in New York City, New York to a Puerto Rican mother and a Jamaican father, he was exposed to music since his earliest years due to his parents' musical careers. His hits with the band included "La quiero a morir", "Juliana", "No Morirá", "Volveré", "Todo mi corazón", and a remake of Ricardo Montaner's original classic "Me va a extrañar". In 2000, he split up with DLG and since had a solo career which, though commercially successful, has not equaled the diverse acclaim accorded DLG. For his first solo album he was awarded "Best New Artist" by Billboard magazine, and received a Grammy nomination. The album was certified Gold and Platinum by RIAA. In 2007 Dunbar was invited by producer Sergio George to reunite with DLG, but Dunbar refused. The seven-year gap between Dunbar's 2003 and 2010 albums has not been publicly explained, but is uncharacteristic of a popular star at the peak of his career. Sales of "Huey Dunbar IV" were strong in Latin America. In Billboard's Tropical Songs chart, the single "Te amaré" had moved from the number 9 song to number 4. "Huey Dunbar IV", debuted on the Tropical Albums chart at Number 2 on March 20, 2010.

Discography

Albums
 Yo Si Me Enamoré - (2001)
 Music for My Peoples - (2003)
 Huey Dunbar IV - (2010)

Singles
 "Con Cada Beso" - (2001)
 "Yo Sí Me Enamoré" - (2001)
 "A Cambio de Qué" - (2002)
 "Sin Poderte Hablar" - (2003)
 "A Dónde Iré" - (2003)
 " Amigos " (2007)  ft Yan weynn Crescent Moon Studios Emilio Estefan 
 "Te Amaré" - (2010)

References

External links
 Official Website
 HueyDunbarPERU
 

1974 births
American people of Puerto Rican descent
American people of Jamaican descent
Puerto Rican people of Jamaican descent
Jamaican people of Puerto Rican descent
Living people
American salsa musicians
21st-century American singers
Latin music songwriters